"Right Here, Right Now" is a song by British big beat musician Fatboy Slim, released on 19 April 1999 as the fourth single from his second studio album, You've Come a Long Way, Baby (1998). The song samples "Ashes, the Rain & I" by James Gang and an Angela Bassett quote from American science fiction thriller film Strange Days (1995). "Right Here, Right Now" reached number two on the UK Singles Chart and became a top-40 hit in Australia, Greece, Iceland, Ireland, New Zealand, and the Walloon region of Belgium. It was voted by Mixmag readers as the 10th-greatest dance record of all time.

Composition
The basic string melody of the song was sampled from the James Gang song "Ashes, the Rain & I" and Antonin Dvorak "Humoresque". The lyrics "right here, right now" are a sample of Angela Bassett's voice saying "This is your life, right here, right now!" from the film Strange Days at the 1:43:21 mark. The album version of "Right Here, Right Now" ends with a radio talk between Bradley Jay, a DJ of the WBCN radio station of Boston, and a Fatboy Slim fan called Brad.

Critical reception

The Daily Record said the song is "brilliant".

Music video
The music video for the song, created by Hammer & Tongs, is an elaborate homage to the famous opening sequence of the French educational series Once Upon a Time... Man. It shows a (scientifically inaccurate) timeline depicting the entire process of human evolution condensed into three and a half minutes. The beginning of the music video is set "350 billion years ago", and starts with a single celled eukaryote in the ocean evolving into a jellyfish, a worm, a pipefish, a pufferfish, and then a predatory fish. It manages to eat a smaller fish before leaping up onto dry land. With a dinosaur visible in the background and an insect in front, it stays still for a few seconds before setting off and eating the insect.

The land-fish evolves into a small alligator as it enters a forest. It sees a tall tree, which it climbs up.  Its body is obscured by the tree as its hands visibly evolve until it arrives at the top as a baboon-like ape. It jumps from the tree into an icy landscape, enduring a blizzard as it evolves into a larger, gorilla-like ape. At the end of a large cliff, the ape beats its chest as the camera zooms out to show a vast desert. The ape jumps onto the ground, where it has evolved into a primate resembling homo erectus. A large storm blows away much of its hair, turning it into a human (at this point the timer at the bottom right slows dramatically). The human runs faster and puts on some trousers and a T-shirt with the logo "I'm #1 so why try harder". When fully clothed, it turns into a modern human with a beard. The man walks through a city environment and eats a hamburger (taken from a cardboard cutout of Fatboy Slim himself), he pulls off the beard and morphs into the obese character depicted on the cover of the album. He finally sits down on a bench as night falls, then smiles and leans back to look up as the human star constellation of Orion appears above.

Track listings
UK and Australian CD single, UK 12-inch single
 "Right Here, Right Now"
 "Don't Forget Your Teeth"
 "Praise You" (original version)

UK cassette single and European CD single
 "Right Here, Right Now"
 "Don't Forget Your Teeth"

Charts

Weekly charts

Year-end charts

Certifications

In popular culture
Manchester City, Arsenal, Inter Milan, Brighton & Hove Albion and   many other teams play this song when their players walk out of the tunnel prior to a match. The song is also used over Video Referee segments in SkySports' coverage of the Super League, a rugby league tournement in Europe.

On 8 October 2019, Fatboy Slim made a remix of the song using environmental activist Greta Thunberg's United Nations speech. The song was used for the opening sequence of the pilot episode for the television series Third Watch.

References

External links
 
 

1998 songs
1999 singles
Fatboy Slim songs
Pittsburgh Steelers
Songs based on speech samples
Skint Records singles
Songs written by Joe Walsh
Songs written by Norman Cook
UK Independent Singles Chart number-one singles